Zaccaria Mouhib (born 26 June 2001), also known as Baby Gang, is an Italian-Moroccan rapper. He began his musical career in 2018, releasing his debut EP, EP1, in 2021.

Career
In 2018, Baby Gang released his debut single, "Street", which was filmed at a train station in Calolziocorte. He would release two other singles, "Education" and "Cella 1", in 2019, which were inspired by his experiences in jail.

In May 2021 , Baby Gang released his debut EP, EP1; it would peak at number 15 on the FIMI Albums Chart. He would release his second EP, Delinquente, the same year; it peaked at number 7 on the same chart.

Legal issues
Between 2020 and 2021, Baby Gang was convicted on several crimes, including defamation, infringement of intellectual property, and others.

On 20 August 2021, he received a DASPO from Milan police for 2 years alongside Rondodasosa following riots at a disco; the order prevented him from entering bars, discos and public places in the city. In April 2022, an exemption was made in order to allow him to play at a club in Milan on 9 May.

In January 2022, Baby Gang was arrested alongside two other rappers for four robberies committed in Milan and Sondrio; it was suspected that the three rappers were behind the robberies. In April, he was arrested for resisting arrest by attacking two police officers and fleeing the scene.

On January 26, 2023 he was sentenced to 4 years and 10 months in prison.

Discography

EPs

Charted singles

As lead artist

As featured artist

References

2001 births
Living people
Italian rappers
People from Lecco
Warner Music Group artists
21st-century Italian criminals
Italian male criminals